Eduard Andreevitch Krushevsky (22 October 1851, Warsaw – 16 March 1916, Petrograd) was a Polish-born Russian conductor and composer.

Born in Warsaw in 1857, Krushevsky finished study in Saint Petersburg Conservatory in 1890.

He was frequently conducting concerts of Imperial Russian musical society. He was capable to conduct without any preparation such difficult operas as Esclarmonde, Mlada, and Falstaff and that his very  ability was the reason for hiring him as the second conductor of the Mariinsky Theatre (where Russian premieres of those works took place).

His compositions include a skillfully written overture and recitatives to the opera Il matrimonio segreto by Cimarosa. Krushevsky was also a first-class piano accompanist.

References

1851 births
1916 deaths
Composers from the Russian Empire
Musicians from Warsaw
Russian conductors (music)
Russian male conductors (music)
Saint Petersburg Conservatory alumni